Ceracap Inai dance is a type of traditional Malay folk dance popular especially in Johor.

History 
Ceracap Inai dance is associated with the history of the Malacca Sultanate, when Sultan Mahmud Shah retreated to Sungai Muar. 

This dance is said to originate from the palace dance and is danced in front of the Sultan and state dignitaries. Therefore, the Ceracap Inai dance has elements of 'worship duli' (worship / forgiveness), humility and is also danced usually in front of the 'King of the Day' / Bride.

Ceracap Inai dance is performed with decorations such as 'Golden Flowers' and lit candles that give meaning to the rays of happiness and well-being. This dance was originally danced by an odd number of dancers or danced in pairs by male and female dancers and can also be danced by female dancers only, The number of dancers usually consists of 5 - 8 people. This dance is very famous in Kampung Baru Lenga, Batu 28, Lenga in Muar District, Johor.

External links 

 Tarian Ceracap Inai|Kebudayaan, Kesenian dan Warisan Kementerian Penerangan, Komunikasi dan Kebudayaan Malaysia
 Tarian Tradisional Portal Rasmi Kerajaan Negeri Johor Darul Ta'zim
 Fauziah Ismail, Showcase folk dances on regular basis|JohorBuzz NST. 2009/06/22
 Ceracap Inai|Kekwa|Festival Kuda Kepang MAKUM 2009|Dewan Budaya, Universiti Sains Malaysia|21 & 22 Mac 2009|Youtube
 Ceracap Inai|KKJ Show Kulaijaya|Youtube|13 Julai 2009

Dances of Malaysia
Malay dances